John Danby (born July 20, 1948) is a Canadian former professional ice hockey player and coach.

Career 
After winning consecutive national championships with Boston University in the early-1970s, Danby joined the New England Whalers of the World Hockey Association. He played throughout the 1970s before retiring and returning to his alma mater to serve as an assistant coach for two seasons.

Awards and honors

References

External links

1948 births
Living people
AHCA Division I men's ice hockey All-Americans
Binghamton Dusters players
Boston University Terriers men's ice hockey players
Canadian ice hockey centres
Cape Codders players
Ice hockey people from Toronto
New England Whalers players
NCAA men's ice hockey national champions